Brett Keisel (born September 19, 1978) is a former American football defensive end who played 12 seasons in the National Football League (NFL) for the Pittsburgh Steelers. He was drafted by the Steelers in the seventh round of the 2002 NFL Draft. He played college football at Brigham Young University.

College career
Keisel was redshirted his freshman year at BYU. He played defensive end his sophomore year and then the following year transferred to Snow College. He then returned to BYU to finish his college football career. Keisel had a total of 66 tackles, with 39 being solo tackles, 9 quarterback sacks, and 19 stops behind the line of scrimmage.

Professional career

The Pittsburgh Steelers selected Keisel in the seventh round (242nd overall) of the 2002 NFL Draft. Keisel was the 21st defensive end drafted in 2002.

On July 23, 2002, the Pittsburgh Steelers signed Keisel to a three-year, $932,000 contract.

 
In his rookie year, he made five appearances, making four tackles.

In 2003, he was on the injured list for the entire season after undergoing surgery on a shoulder injury. He returned in the 2004 season with 13 appearances and nine tackles. The following year, he appeared in  all 16 games recording 33 tackles and three sacks, the first of his NFL career. After the departure of Kimo von Oelhoffen via free agency for the New York Jets in March 2006, Keisel signed a new four-year contract with the Steelers, worth a reported 14 million dollars. That season, he won the starting position at right defensive end and played in all 16 games making 55 tackles and 5.5 sacks, a career-high. In 2007, he made 16 appearances recording 39 tackles and two sacks.

On August 31, 2009, the Steelers signed Keisel to a new five-year contract worth $18.885 million, including a $5 million signing bonus.

In 2010, Keisel had his first career interception and first career touchdown in week 3 against the Tampa Bay Buccaneers, when he intercepted a pass thrown by Josh Freeman and returned it 79 yards for a touchdown. At the end of the 2010 season, Keisel and the Steelers appeared in Super Bowl XLV against the Green Bay Packers. He was a starter in the game and recorded three total tackles in the 31–25 loss.  Keisel was also added to the AFC Pro Bowl roster for the first time in his career.

In 2014, following the expiration of his 2009 contract, Keisel entered free agency.  While agent Eric Metz stated that Keisel "has every intention to continue to play football," no contract had yet been offered by the Steelers organization.

On August 19, 2014, Keisel agreed to re-sign with the Steelers, signing a 2-year contract worth $3 million, including a $500,000 signing bonus.

On March 9, 2015, Keisel was released by the Steelers.

In June 2015, Keisel announced his retirement.

Personal life
Keisel lettered four times in football and basketball and twice in track at Greybull High School in Greybull, Wyoming. He was a four-time All-Conference selection and earned All-State honors as a tight end and linebacker (1995–96), was the USA Today Wyoming Player of the Year in his final season, and earned Sportslink Player of the Year and Conference Player of the Year honors in 1996.

Keisel is a member of the Church of Jesus Christ of Latter-day Saints.

Keisel excelled at both football and basketball and initially wanted to go to college for basketball. He researched the statistics of players that were in the NBA at the time and found that his size wouldn't compare to those playing basketball at the professional level. He then turned his attention and athletic ability to football.

He is the son of Connie and Lane Keisel. He has three sisters: Peggy, Kalli, and Codi; and four brothers: Tom, Lance, Chris, and Chad. He is married to his high school sweetheart, Sarah. The couple have three children.

Since retirement from football, Brett and his wife Sarah have been involved with numerous charitable organizations, including the Cystic Fibrosis Foundation.

In 2018, Keisel was a pallbearer at the funeral of brothers Cecil and David Rosenthal, who were killed in the Pittsburgh synagogue shooting. Their sister, Michele Rosenthal, was the former head of public relations for the Pittsburgh Steelers.

"Da Beard"
Keisel began growing "Da Beard" while on a summertime hunting trip with his father. Keisel's facial hair gained fame during the end of the 2010 NFL season. Many NFL players grow "rally beards" during the playoffs to bring them good luck. His beard has its own Facebook page and Twitter account and was mentioned repeatedly in the media during the Steelers' playoff run.

In an interview on Steelers.com, Keisel explained that he had decided to grow out his beard after having a discussion about the lack of characters in the NFL. In another interview, though, to the Pittsburgh Post-Gazette, he said he wanted to change the team's luck, because it missed the playoffs the previous season. On July 27th, 2022, as a guest on Steelers' Defensive Linemen Cam Hewyard's "Not Just Football" Podcast, Keisel said that he started growing it partly due to superstition. He followed up saying that the Pittsburgh Penguins had just recently won the Stanley Cup, and that he saw the playoff beards the players grew, and was a fan of them, and wanted to try it out. 

Keisel refers to his beard as a "beautiful thing" and "the greatest beard of all time" and has , encouraged other Steelers to grow beards as well. After the Super Bowl several videos were made about Keisel's beard, including one that portrayed him as a Hasidic Jew.

On February 24, 2011, "Da Beard" was removed during a ceremony titled "Shear the Beard" in downtown Pittsburgh. The event raised over $40,000 for the Children's Hospital of Pittsburgh of UPMC. Keisel stated that "Da Beard" would most likely return for the upcoming season. "Da Beard will decide when the time is right to come back," he said, "and it will all of a sudden appear." Keisel dubbed the 2011 season "Da Beard Revenge Tour". On February 9, 2012, Keisel held "The Second Annual Shear the Beard Event." Just as in the previous year, proceeds raised went to the Children's Hospital of Pittsburgh. It was announced on January 8, 2013, that "The Third Annual Shear the Beard Event" would be held on February 7, 2013, at Jergel's Rhythm Grille in Warrendale, PA, with all proceeds benefiting the cancer program at Children's Hospital. It was announced on January 14, 2014, that "The Fourth Annual Shear the Beard Event" would be held on February 5, 2014, at Jergel's Rhythm Grille in Warrendale, PA, with all proceeds benefiting the cancer program at Children's Hospital. Shear Da Beard recently celebrated its tenth and final year. Shavers such as Ben Roethlisberger, James Harrison, Cameron Heyward, and Arthur Moats have taken part in the shaving of Keisel's beard. Cancer survivor Sean Nolan has even joined in on the festivities.

References

External links

Brett Keisel Official Website
Steelers Player Bio

1978 births
Living people
American football defensive ends
BYU Cougars football players
Pittsburgh Steelers players
Latter Day Saints from Wyoming
Sportspeople from Provo, Utah
People from Greybull, Wyoming
Players of American football from Utah
Players of American football from Wyoming
Latter Day Saints from Utah
Snow Badgers football players